Nova Sich or Pidpilnenska Sich ( or ) was the administrative and military center of the Zaporozhian Cossacks in 1734–1775, established after the return of the Zaporozhian Lowland Army to the Russian protectorate as a result of the signing of the Lubny Treaty. The last Zaporozhian Sich was located on a large peninsula, washed by the river Pidpilna (a tributary of the Dnieper).

Establishment 
Nova Sich was founded with the permission and under the supervision of the Russian government on March 31, 1734, by Ataman-Hetman I. Malashevich on the Right Bank of the Dnieper in the Great Flood, which occupied 26 thousand acres.

The basis for the continued existence of the Nova Sich as a territory was signed in 1734, the Lubny Treaty on the recognition of the Russian protectorate by the Cossacks.

To oversee the actions of the Cossacks, the imperial government built a fortification 2 km from the Nova Sich with two half-bastions and a permanent garrison - the so-called Novosichensky retransmission.

According to historians, the Novosichensk retrenchment was erected in the Sich by the imperial government for the ostentatious purpose of helping the Cossacks in their war with the Ottomans, but in reality, for the hidden purpose of keeping them in their hands. However, the Cossacks well understood the reason for the construction of the Russian citadel, expressing their dissatisfaction with the words: "We have a Moscow sore liver." Given the historical events that took place during the existence of the Nova Sich, we must recognize that the imperial government achieved its goal by dissuading the Sich from participating in the nationwide struggle against deprivation.

Location and components of the Sich 
On three sides, Sich was surrounded by a tributary of the Dnieper River Pidpilna, which sailed Zaporozhye seagulls and Turkish and Greek merchant ships (tumbasy), which sailed to the Sich harbor in the river bay Ustup. On the north - eastern side of the underground separated branch - the river Sysyna, which flows into the Dnieper.

Sich was a city - a fortress surrounded by a rampart and palisades. The Underground Sich consisted of three parts: the suburbs, or the so-called shop bazaar, where all tents and visitors had their shops and taverns for trade, where there were houses of market atamans and military cantary or keeper of scales. This suburb was called Hassan - Basha. From it began the gate that led to Kosh - the main fortification, where around the Sich Square were located 38 huts. The huts were spacious barracks. Between the huts of the Ustup Bay and the Podpilna River is the Inner Kish or Palanka, separated by a wall from the Outer Kosh. Palanka housed the houses of the Kosh Ataman and Sich officers, as well as the Sich Cathedral Church of the Intercession of the Mother of God, the military chancellery, the treasury and the houses of the clergy.

To the west of Kosh was the fortification of the Novosichensk retrenchment built by the tsarist government to control Sich. Here was a Russian commandant with a garrison of land militia regiments.

History 
It is noteworthy that it was during the existence of the Nova Sich that an independent Cossack-military group called the Haidamaky emerged. The Haydamatsky movement began in 1734 with the inaction of the first Novosichensk Ataman-Hetman I. Malashevych in the protection of the rights and freedoms of the Ukrainian people, when in 1734-1738 large detachments of insurgents led by G. Goly, M. Golim, M. Mane, S. Chalym and others.

An epidemic broke out in the Sich in 1760, and entry and exit from the Sich were banned.

In 1768 a Cossack revolt (known as the "Gray revolt") broke out, during which the Kosh Ataman Kalnyshevskyi and the Cossack sergeant hid in the Novosichensk retrenchment. The rebels tried to choose Philip Fedoriv, but were quickly dispersed.

The Zaporozhian Army left the Nova Sich for the Russo-Turkish War of 1735–1739 and the War of 1768–1774.

Destruction 

In early June 1775, by order of Catherine II, the Nova Sich was destroyed, and the liberty of the Zaporozhian Army was annulled. After the end of the Russo-Turkish War (1768-1774), in which the Zaporozhian Cossacks took an active part, Lieutenant General Peter Tekeli led 10 infantry, 13 Russian Cossack, 8 cavalry regular regiments, 20 hussars, and 17 Picker squadrons to the Sich. Despite the small number, the Cossacks appealed to the Kosh Ataman Peter Kalnyshevsky for permission to defend himself to death. However, wealthy officers advised Koshov to give in without any conditions; in addition, the priest of the Sich Church of the Intercession, Volodymyr Sokalsky, began to ask that they avoid fratricide. In the end, the Kosh Ataman surrendered Sich without a fight. On June 4, 1775, the Nova (Pidpilnenska) Sich passed away.

On the site of the Sich the village of Pokrovske later appeared, which in the 1950s was submerged under the waters of the artificial Kakhovka Reservoir.

Sources 

 В. В. Панашенко. Нова Січ // Енциклопедія історії України : у 10 т. / редкол.: В. А. Смолій (голова) та ін. ; Інститут історії України НАН України. — К. : Наукова думка, 2010. — Т. 7 : Мл — О. — С. 437. — 728 с. : іл. — ISBN 978-966-00-1061-1.

References

Further reading 
 Панашенко Віра. Нова Січ (1734—1775 рр.) // Козацькі січі (нариси з історії українського козацтва XVI–XIX ст.) / В. Смолій (відп. ред.), В. Щербак (наук. ред.), Т. Чухліб (упорядн.), О. Гуржій, В. Матях, А. Сокульський, В. Степанков. — НАН України. Інститут історії України; Науково-дослідний інститут козацтва. — Київ; Запоріжжя, 1998. — С 149–189.
 Апанович О. Нова (Підпільненська) Січ // Малий словник історії України / відпов. ред. В. А. Смолій. — К. : Либідь, 1997. — 464 с. — ISBN 5-325-00781-5.
 Місце і час перебування Запорозької Січі
 Пірко В. О. Наступ на землі Війська Запорозького в період Нової Січі // Українська козацька держава: витоки та шляхи історичного розвитку. Матеріали IV Всеукраїнських історичних читань. — Київ-Черкаси, 1995.

External links 
 Нова Січ // Юридична енциклопедія : [у 6 т.] / ред. кол.: Ю. С. Шемшученко (відп. ред.) [та ін.]. — К. : Українська енциклопедія ім. М. П. Бажана, 2002. — Т. 4 : Н — П. — 720 с. — ISBN 966-7492-04-4.
 Підпільна // Українська мала енциклопедія : 16 кн. : у 8 т. / проф. Є. Онацький. — Накладом Адміністратури УАПЦ в Аргентині. — Буенос-Айрес, 1963. — Т. 6, кн. XI : Літери Пере — По. — С. 1381. — 1000 екз

Former populated places in Ukraine
Zaporizhian Sich
Early Modern history of Ukraine
History of the Cossacks in Ukraine
States and territories disestablished in 1775
Zaporozhian Cossacks
Zaporozhian Host